In Greek mythology, Eurycleia (Ancient Greek: Εὐρύκλεια Eurýkleia) or Euryclia may refer to the following women:

 Eurycleia, nurse of Odysseus.
 Eurycleia, a Boeotian princess as the daughter of King Athamas and Themisto, and thus, sister to Leucon, Erythrius, Schoeneus, and Ptous. She became the mother of Hyperes by Melas, son of Phrixus and Chalciope.

Notes

References 

 Apollodorus, The Library with an English Translation by Sir James George Frazer, F.B.A., F.R.S. in 2 Volumes, Cambridge, MA, Harvard University Press; London, William Heinemann Ltd. 1921. ISBN 0-674-99135-4. Online version at the Perseus Digital Library. Greek text available from the same website.
 Gaius Julius Hyginus, Fabulae from The Myths of Hyginus translated and edited by Mary Grant. University of Kansas Publications in Humanistic Studies. Online version at the Topos Text Project.
 Homer, The Odyssey with an English Translation by A.T. Murray, Ph.D. in two volumes. Cambridge, MA., Harvard University Press; London, William Heinemann, Ltd. 1919. Online version at the Perseus Digital Library. Greek text available from the same website.

Princesses in Greek mythology
Boeotian characters in Greek mythology
Boeotian mythology